Eduardo Farré (born 16 October 1942) is an Argentine sailor. He competed in the Star event at the 2000 Summer Olympics.

References

External links
 

1942 births
Living people
Argentine male sailors (sport)
Olympic sailors of Argentina
Sailors at the 2000 Summer Olympics – Star
Place of birth missing (living people)